The Mansion Passos Oliveira was a historic building in the city of São José dos Pinhais, Brazilian state of Paraná.

The building was demolished in June 2011 and was the last copy of neoclassical Italian in the city. The building was built in 1876.

References 

Buildings and structures in Paraná (state)
Demolished buildings and structures in Brazil
Buildings and structures demolished in 2011
Buildings and structures completed in 1876